Bennington High School is a high school in Bennington, Nebraska, United States. It is a public school with an enrollment of 885 students.

Along with the Bennington Elementary School, Heritage Elementary School, Pine Creek Elementary School, Anchor Pointe Elementary School, and Bennington Middle School, their mascot is the badger named “Tuffy”. The school colors are royal blue and white.

References

External links
 Bennington Public Schools website

Public high schools in Nebraska
Schools in Douglas County, Nebraska
Eastern Midlands Conference